3rd Tank Regiment may refer to:
3rd Royal Tank Regiment, a British unit extant 1917 – 1992
3rd Tank Regiment (Japan), extant 1937 – 1945